The Arsacid dynasty, called the Arshakuni in Armenian, ruled the Kingdom of Armenia from 12 to 428. The dynasty was a branch of the Arsacid dynasty of Parthia. Arsacid kings reigned intermittently throughout the chaotic years following the fall of the Artaxiad dynasty until 62 when Tiridates I, brother of the Parthian king Vologases I, secured Arsacid rule in Armenia as a client king of Rome. However, he did not succeed in establishing his line on the throne, and various princes of different Arsacid lineages ruled until the accession of Vologases II, who succeeded in establishing his own line on the Armenian throne, which ruled the kingdom until its abolishment by the Sasanian Empire in 428.

Two of the most notable events under Arsacid rule in Armenian history were the conversion of Armenia to Christianity by Gregory the Illuminator and Tiridates III in 301/314 and the creation of the Armenian alphabet by Mesrop Mashtots in c. 405. In contrast to the more Hellenic-influenced Artaxiads, the reign of the Arsacids of Armenia was marked by greater Iranian influence in the country.

Early Arsacids

The first appearance of an Arsacid on the Armenian throne occurred in 12 when the Parthian king Vonones I was exiled from Parthia due to his pro-Roman policies and Occidental manners. Vonones I briefly acquired the Armenian throne with Roman consent, but Artabanus II, incorrectly known as Artabanus III in older scholarship, demanded his deposition, and as Emperor Augustus did not wish to begin a war with the Parthians he deposed Vonones I and sent him to Syria. Soon after the deposition of Vonones I, Artabanus II installed his son Orodes on the Armenian throne. Emperor Tiberius had no intention of giving up the buffer states of the Eastern frontier and sent his nephew and heir Germanicus to the East. Germanicus concluded a treaty with Artabanus II, in which he was recognized as king and friend of the Romans.

Armenia was given in 18 to Zeno, son of Polemon I of Pontus, who assumed the Iranian name Artaxias (a.k.a. Zeno-Artaxias). The Parthians under Artabanus II were too distracted by internal strife to oppose the Roman-appointed King. Zeno's reign was remarkably peaceful in Armenian history. After Zeno's death in 36, Artabanus II decided to reinstate an Arsacid over the Armenian throne, choosing his eldest son Arsaces I as a suitable candidate, but his succession to the Armenian throne was disputed by his younger brother Orodes who was previously overthrown by Zeno. Tiberius quickly concentrated more forces on the Roman frontier and once again after a decade of peace, Armenia was to become the theater of bitter warfare between the two greatest powers of the known world for the next twenty-five years.

Tiberius, sent an Iberian named Mithridates, who claimed to be of Arsacid blood. Mithridates successfully subjugated Armenia to the Roman rule and deposed Arsaces inflicting huge devastation to the country. Surprisingly, Mithridates was summoned back to Rome where he was kept a prisoner, and Armenia was given back to Artabanus II who gave the throne to his younger son Orodes. Another civil war erupted in Parthia upon Artabanus II's death. In the meantime Mithridates was put back on the Armenian throne, with the help of his brother, Pharasmanes I, and Roman troops. Civil war continued in Parthia for several years with Gotarzes eventually seizing the throne in 45.

In 51 Mithridates’ nephew Rhadamistus (a.k.a. Ghadam) invaded Armenia and killed his uncle. The governor of Cappadocia, Julius Pailinus, decided to conquer Armenia but he settled with the crowning of Radamistus who generously rewarded him. The current Parthian King Vologases I, saw an opportunity, invaded Armenia and succeeded in forcing the Iberians to withdraw from Armenia. The harsh winter that followed proved too much for the Parthians who also withdrew, thus leaving open doors for Radamistus to regain his throne. After regaining power, according to Tacitus, the Iberian was so cruel that the Armenians stormed the palace and forced Radamistus out of the country and  Vologases I got the opportunity to install his brother Tiridates on the throne.

Between Rome and Parthia
Unhappy with the growing Parthian influence at their doorstep, Roman emperor Nero sent General Gnaeus Domitius Corbulo with a large army to the east in order to install Roman client kings (see Roman–Parthian War of 58–63). After Tiridates I escaped, Roman client king Tigranes VI was installed and in 61 he invaded the Kingdom of Adiabene, which was one of the Parthian vassal kingdoms.
Vologases I considered this as an act of aggression from Rome and restarted a campaign to restore Tiridates I to the Armenian throne. In the following Battle of Rhandeia in 62, command of the Roman troops was again entrusted to Corbulo, who marched into Armenia and set a camp in Rhandeia, where he made a peace agreement with Tiridates according to which the latter was recognized as a king of Armenia but agreed to become Roman client king in that he would go to Rome to be crowned by Emperor Nero. Tiridates ruled Armenia until his death or deposition around 110 when Parthian king Osroes I invaded Armenia and enthroned his nephew Axidares, son of the previous Parthian king Pacorus II, as King of Armenia.

This encroachment on the traditional sphere of influence of the Roman Empire started a new war between Parthia and Rome, ending the peace that had endured for about half a century since Nero's time. The Roman emperor Trajan marched towards Armenia in October 113 to restore a Roman client king in Armenia. Envoys from Osroes I met Trajan at Athens, informing him that Axidares had been deposed and asking that Axidares' elder brother, Parthamasiris, be granted the throne. Trajan declined their proposal and in August 114 captured Arsamosata where Parthamasiris asked to be crowned, but instead of crowning him he annexed his kingdom as a new province to the Roman Empire.
 Parthamasiris was dismissed and died mysteriously soon afterwards.

As a Roman province Armenia was administered along with Cappadocia by Lucius Catilius Severus. The Roman Senate issued coins which had celebrated this occasion and had borne the following inscription: ARMENIA ET MESOPOTAMIA IN POTESTATEM P.R. REDACTÆ, thus solidifying Armenia's position as the newest Roman province. After a rebellion led by a pretender to the Parthian throne (Sanatruces II, son of Mithridates V), was put down, some sporadic resistance continued and Vologases III managed to secure a sizeable chunk of Armenia just before Trajan's death in August 117. However, in 118 the new Emperor Hadrian gave up Trajan's conquered lands, including Armenia, and installed Parthamaspates as King of Armenia and Osroene, although the Parthian King Vologases held most of Armenian territory. Eventually compromise with the Parthians was reached and Parthian Vologases was placed in charge of Armenia.

Vologase ruled Armenia until 140. Vologases IV, son of legitimate Parthian king Mithridates V, dispatched his troops to seize Armenia in 161 and eradicated the Roman legions stationed there under legatus Gaius Severianus. Encouraged by the spahbod Osroes, Parthian troops marched further West into Roman Syria.

Marcus Aurelius immediately sent Lucius Verus to the Eastern front. In 163, Verus dispatched General Statius Priscus, who was recently transferred from Britain along with several legions, from Syrian Antioch to Armenia. The Artaxata army under Vologases IV' command surrendered to Roman general Priscus who installed a Roman puppet, Sohaemus (Roman senator and consul of Arsacid and Emessan ancestry), on the Armenian throne, deposing a certain Pacorus installed by Vologases III.

As a result of an epidemic within the Roman forces, Parthians retook most of their lost territory in 166 and forced Sohaemus to retreat to Syria. After a few intervening Roman and Parthian rulers, Vologases II assumed the throne in 186. In 198 Vologases II assumed the Parthian throne and named his son Khosrov I to the Armenian throne. Khosrov I was subsequently captured by the Romans, who installed one of their own to take charge of Armenia. However the Armenians themselves revolted against their Roman overlords, and in accordance to new Rome-Parthia compromise, Khosrov I's son, Tiridates II (217–252), was made king of Armenia.

Sassanids and Armenia
In 224 the Persian king Ardashir I overthrew the Arsacids in Parthia and found the new Persian Sassanid dynasty. The Sassanids were determined to restore the old glory of the Achaemenid Persia, so they proclaimed Zoroastrianism as the state religion and considered Armenia as part of their empire.

To preserve the autonomy of Arsacid rule in Armenia, Tiridates II sought friendly relations with Rome. This was an unfortunate choice, because the Sassanid king Shapur I defeated the Romans and made peace with the emperor Philip. In 252 Shapur I invaded Armenia and forced Tiridates II to flee. After the deaths of Tiridates II and his son Khosrov II, Shapur I installed his own son Hurmazd on the Armenian throne. When Shapur I died in 270, Hurmazd took the Persian throne and his brother Narseh ruled Armenia in his name.

Under Diocletian, Rome installed Tiridates III as ruler of Armenia, and in 287 he was in possession of the western parts of Armenian territory. The Sassanids stirred some nobles to revolt when Narseh left to take the Persian throne in 293. Rome nevertheless defeated Narseh in 298, and Khosrov II's son Tiridates III regained control over Armenia with the support of Roman soldiers.

Christianization

As late as the later Parthian period, Armenia was predominantly Zoroastrian. However, this was soon to change. In 301, Saint Gregory the Illuminator converted king Tiridates III and members of his court to Christianity traditionally dated to 301 according to historian Mikayel Chamchian's "Patmutiun Hayots i Skzbane Ashkharhi Minchev tsam diarn" (1784).

The Armenian alphabet was created by Saint Mesrop Mashtots in 405 AD for the purpose of Bible translation, and Christianization as thus also marks the beginning of Armenian literature. According to Movses Khorenatsi, Isaac of Armenia made a translation of the Gospel from the Syriac text about 411. This work must have been considered imperfect, because soon afterward John of Egheghiatz and Joseph of Baghin, two of Mashtots' students, were sent to Edessa to translate the Biblical scriptures. They journeyed as far as Constantinople, and brought back with them authentic copies of the Greek text. With the help of other copies obtained from Alexandria the Bible was translated again from the Greek according to the text of the Septuagint and Origen's Hexapla. This version, now used by the Armenian Church, was completed about 434.

Decline
During the reign of Tigranes VII (Tiran), the Sassanid King Shapur II invaded Armenia. During the following decades, Armenia was once again disputed territory between the Byzantine Empire and the Sassanid Empire, until a permanent settlement in 387, which remained in place until the Arab conquest of Armenia in 639. Arsacid rulers intermittently (competing with Bagratuni princes) remained in control preserving their power to some extent, as border guardians (marzban) either under Byzantine or as a Sassanian protectorate, until 428.

Culture
Out of the three phases (Achaemenid, Arsacid, Sasanian) of Iranian influence in Armenia, the Arsacid one was the strongest and most enduring. The phase began with the ascendance of the Parthians in the 2nd-century BC, and reached its zenith following the establishment of a Arsacid branch on the Armenian throne in the mid-1st century AD. The Arsacid kings of Armenia attempted to base their court on the same model as the one in Ctesiphon. Many Parthian aspects were directly imported into Armenian civilization, such as the gusan, which resembled a bard or minstrel. In Arsacid Armenia, the custom of aristocratic children being raised by foster parents or tutors was widespread, as in the rest of the Iranian commonwealth.

The Arsacid kings knew Parthia and regarded it as their native country. Tiridates III is known to have said the following thing during a speech: "For I know the country of the Greeks and that of the Romans very well, and our regions of Parthia—for it is even our home—as well as Asorestan, Arabia and Atropatene." Under the Arsacids, the Armenians became familiar with some of the stories that were later added into the Persian epic Shahnameh. This includes the stories of figures such as Hraseak (Afrasiyab), Sawarsh (Siyavash) and Spandarat (Esfandiyar).

The Armenians viewed the bond between their country and the royal houses of Parthia as indestructible. Armenian sources use the terms "king" and "Arsacid" (Aršakuni) as synonyms. The Arsacid king was regarded as the bnak tērn ašxarhis ("natural lord of this country").

Imperial ideology and religious practices
The Arsacids were advocates of Iranian legitimacy, which they remained even after the fall of the Parthian Empire. They insisted that they carried the xwarrah ("fortune", cognate of Armenian pʿaṙkʿ), which was the divine glory wielded by legitimate Iranian and Iranic kings. The city of Ani served as the centre of the cult of Aramazd (the Armenian equivalent of Ahura Mazda), as well as the royal necropolis of the Arsacids. In the same fashion as the Achaemenid Empire (550–330 BC), the Arsacids of Armenia and Iran practiced entombment and burial, probably doing it with great care to avoid contaminating the sacred earth of the Zoroastrian yazata (angelic divinity) Spenta Armaiti. The bones of the buried Arsacid kings were believed to carry their xwarrah, which was the reason that the Sasanian shahanshah Shapur II had their bones disinterred and taken out of Armenia following his raid on the necropolis. The tombs were seemingly strongly fortified, since Shapur II was unable to open the tomb of Sanatruk.

The ancient sanctuary of Bagawan was of high importance to the Arsacids, who celebrated the Iranian New Year's festival (Nowruz) there. The boar, which was the favourite totem of the yazata Verethragna (Vahagn in Armenian) was the symbol of the Arsacids.

Language and naming traditions
While the culture of Armenia was dominated by Hellenism under the Artaxiads, the reign of the Arsacids marked the predominance of Iranianism in the country, with Parthian replacing Greek as the language of the educated. However, Armenian Hellenism was not eradicated, as the Arsacids of Iran were proud philhellenes. Armenian was considered a "vulgar" language, and thus Parthian language was spoken amongst the upper class and at the court. It was during this period that Classical Armenian incorporated most of its Iranian loanwords. The modern historians R. Schmitt and H. W. Bailey compare the Parthian influence on Armenian to that of the French influence on English following the Norman Conquest of 1066.

After their conversion to Christianity, the Arsacids continued to preserve their Iranian naming traditions, as demonstrated by the male names Trdat, Khosrov, Tiran, Arshak, Pap, Varazdat and Vramshapuh, as well as the female names Ashkhen, Zarmandukht, Khosrovdukht, Ormazdukht, Vardandukht, and notably the name of Nerses I's mother Bambishn, which means queen in Persian. Overall, the Christian Arsacids remained true to their Arsacid Iranian traditions.

Arsacid kings of Armenia
This is a list of the kings of Armenia between –428, most of whom were members of the Arsacid dynasty. The list also mentions the non-dynastic rulers of Armenia as well as periods of interregnum. Note that some dates are approximations.

 Vonones I 12–18
 Artaxias III (Zeno Artaxias, non-Arsacid) 18–34
 Arsaces I of Armenia 35
 Mithridates of Armenia (Pharnavazid dynasty) 35–37
 Orodes of Armenia 37–42
 Mithridates of Armenia (again) 42–51
 Rhadamistus (Pharnavazid dynasty) 51–53, 54–55 
 Tiridates/Trdat I 52–58, 62–66, officially 66–88
 Tigranes VI (Herodian dynasty) 59–62
 Sanatruces (Sanatruk) 88–110
 Axidares (Ashkhadar) 110–113 
 Parthamasiris (Partamasir) 113–114
 Roman annexation 114–117/8
 Vologases I (Vagharsh I) 117/8–144
 Sohaemus (non-Arsacid) 144–161, 164–186
 Pacorus (Bakur) 161–164
 Vologases II (Vagharsh II) 186–198
 Khosrov I 198–217
 Trdat II 217–252
 Khosrov II c. 252
 Hormizd-Ardashir (Sassanid dynasty) 252–c. 270
 Narseh (Sassanid dynasty) c. 271–293
 Trdat III 287–330
 Khosrov III 330–339
 Tiran 339-c. 350
 Arshak II c. 350–368
 Sassanid conquest (Shapur II) 368–370
 Pap 370–374
 Varazdat 374–378
 Arshak III 378–387 with co-ruler Vagharshak 378–386
 Khosrov IV 387–389
 Vramshapuh 389–417
 Possibly Khosrov IV (again) 417–418
 Shapur (Sassanid dynasty) 418–422
 Artashes/Artashir 422–428

References

Sources

Further reading 

 
Iranian families
Christianization
Roman buffer states